Bacteriophage PBC1 is a bacteriophage that infects the spore-forming bacterium Bacillus cereus.

References

Siphoviridae